Jaborandi may refer to:

Jaborandi, São Paulo, a municipality in Brazil
Jaborandi, Bahia, a municipality in Brazil
 Jaborandi, common name for several plant species in genus Pilocarpus